Scott Stirling (born August 2, 1977) is an American former professional ice hockey goaltender. He is the head coach of the Gilmour Academy boys prep hockey team in Cleveland, Ohio.

Playing career
Stirling attended Brown University from 1996 to 2000 where he played NCAA Division I college hockey with the Brown Bears men's ice hockey team. Undrafted, Stirling began his professional career in 2000 by joining the Trenton Titans of the ECHL, winning the John A. Daley Trophy as the ECHL Rookie of the Year. He went on to play parts of six seasons in the ECHL, being twice selected the ECHL Goaltender of the Year, and being named the ECHL Most Valuable Player for the 2003–04 season. He also backstopped the Atlantic City Boardwalk Bullies to capture the 2003 Kelly Cup as ECHL Champions. In November 2010, Stirling was named to the ECHL All-Decade Team.

Personal
His father is Steve Stirling, the long-time NCAA and American Hockey League coach.

Awards and honors

References

External links

Living people
1977 births
Atlantic City Boardwalk Bullies players
Bridgeport Sound Tigers players
Brown Bears men's ice hockey players
Danbury Trashers players
Fresno Falcons players
Ice hockey players from Massachusetts
Omaha Lancers players
Peoria Rivermen (ECHL) players
Portland Pirates players
San Antonio Rampage players
Trenton Titans players
Worcester IceCats players
American men's ice hockey goaltenders